The Oberaargau is the region that encompasses the upper watershed of the Aar River in the canton of Bern in Switzerland. On the north, lie the Jura Mountains, and on the south the hills leading to the Emmental.

Administratively, the Oberaargau forms a district within the  region Emmental-Oberaargau of the canton of Bern.
Historically (until 2009), the Oberaargau comprised the two administrative districts of Wangen and Aarwangen.

Geography
It lies in the extreme northeast corner of the canton and includes the districts of Aarwangen and Wangen, and part of the district of Trachselwald. It is surrounded by the cantons of Solothurn, Aargau, and Lucerne. It is connected to the rest of the canton of Bern only in the south, where it borders on the Emmenthal.

The Oberaargau lies on the Swiss Plateau between the large population centers of Bern and Zürich and has therefore become a major thoroughfare for traffic running both east and west and north and south. The Aar River traverses it from west to east, and the primary motorway of Switzerland (the A1) and the main Bern-Zürich railway run through it, making it a central transport region.

The primary city is Langenthal, and the towns of Herzogenbuchsee, Wangen, and Aarwangen are important transportation centers. Since the building of the motorway, the primary economic development has taken place in the north, at the foot of the Jura Mountains, particularly in the towns of Wiedlisbach and Niederbipp.

The highest point in the Oberaargaus is the Höllchöpfli in the municipality of Rumisberg, at 1231 meters, and the lowest point is on the Aare at Wynau, at 405 meters.

Administrative district

The Oberaargau District in the Canton of Bern was created on 1 January 2010.

Mergers
On 1 January 2021 the former municipality of Obersteckholz merged into Langenthal.

History
The region was already known as the Oberaargau in the early Middle Ages (in Latin superior pagus Aragauginsis). However, this concept also included the Emmenthal.

In the High Middle Ages, the area was divided among the counts of Froburg, Aarwangen (later Grünenberg), Zähringen (later the Habsburgs).

As the political influence of the city of Bern increased in the late Middle Ages, the Oberaargau came more and more into its sphere of influence. In the 15th century, Bern conquered both the Oberaargau and the Unteraargau and ruled them as one.

When Bern lost its old power in 1798, the Unteraargau became the modern canton of Aargau. The boundary between the Oberaargau and Unteraargau was fixed in 1798 along the Wigger River. In 1802, however, it was shifted west to Murg river. This action was confirmed by the Act of Mediation of Napoleon in 1803 and the Congress of Vienna in 1815.

References
Notes

Citations

External links
Regional Web site (in German)

Regions of Switzerland
Geography of Switzerland